R61 may refer to:
 R61 (South Africa), a road
 , a destroyer of the Royal Navy
 R61: May cause harm to the unborn child, a risk phrase